Jal  is a pop rock band from Lahore, Punjab, Pakistan. The band originally consisted of songwriter, vocalist and lead guitarist, Goher Mumtaz and vocalist, Atif Aslam and later joined by bass guitarist Omer Nadeem  and later Salman Albert joined on drums in 2003. Founded in 2002, they first became popular playing in Lahore's underground music scene with the release of their song "Aadat".

The band initially achieved commercial success with the release of their music video "Aadat", directed by Umer Anwar, in 2003. After the success of the single, lead vocalist Atif Aslam parted ways with the band, due to differences with lead guitarist Goher Mumtaz, to pursue a career as a solo artist. This led to Mumtaz recruiting musicians Farhan Saeed on vocals and Aamir Tufail aka Shazi on bass guitar. The band's new line-up followed with the release of their début studio album, Aadat, in 2004. The album was declared as the best selling album of 2004 on Geo TV by the record label Sadaf Stereo. Soon afterwards, the band recorded and released their second studio album Boondh in 2007, which topped several music charts in South Asia. The band went on to win the MTV Asia Award for Favorite Artist India in 2006. In 2011, Farhan Saeed also left the band to pursue a solo career, with Goher Mumtaz taking over as the lead vocalist of the band. Jal came out with their third studio album 'Pyaas' which was released to the fans delight on 11 March 2013 in both Pakistan (by Hum Network, M Records) and India (Universal Music). The album 'pyaas' featured remixes by DJ AKS. But even after that, On 23 December 2013, Aamir Tufail aka Shazi officially left the band.

Jal performed songs from their album Pyaas, apart from their old hits, in London's O2 Arena in June 2013.

History

Early years (1998–2001)
Goher Mumtaz and Atif Aslam met each other while the latter was studying at the Punjab College in Lahore, Punjab, Pakistan, in 1998.

Formation (2001–2003)

Soon afterwards, the band started to gain popularity in Lahore's underground music scene and gained a large following due to the success of their song "Aadat". The band then went on to release the music video for the song, directed by Umer Anwar, through ARY Digital and The Musik, in December 2003. The video was soon rated as the fourth best video of the year 2003 by ARY The Muzik, within days of its release.

However, by the end of December 2003, Atif parted ways with the band due to musical differences with lead guitarist, Goher Mumtaz, to pursue a career as a solo artist.  This led Goher to recruit musicians, Farhan Saeed on vocals and Aamir Tufail on bass guitar. Farhan was suggested by Sultan Raja, bassist of Call, who introduced him to Goher and thus joining the band as its vocalist. By this time the band, with a new line-up, re-did the song "Aadat" as its video was already being aired on local music channels with the former lead vocalist, Atif Aslam's, voice.

Revival (2004–2006)
 
Following the release of the band's first single, Jal soon entered the recording studios to work on their début studio album release. The band had recruited bassist Aamir Tufail along with vocalist Farhan Saeed, and started to work on their first album. The album was composed by Goher and was produced by  Zulfiqar Jabbar Khan and Mekaal Hasan, previously produced the band's début single "Aadat" which was a major hit in both India and Pakistan. Jal then went on recording and releasing their début studio album, Aadat, through the record label Sadaf Stereo, on 27 September 2004. Mostly all singles from the album did really well at the local music charts, most notably "Aadat" which topped the charts and stayed at the top for two weeks. Whereas, five other songs from the album received Top 40 airplay on radio and music channels in Pakistan. Sales of the album were such that it remained at the top of the Pakistani music charts for several weeks after its release. The album was declared as the best selling album of 2004 on Geo TV by the record label Sadaf Stereo. This was followed by the album being released in India by HOM Records. In October, Jal released their second single "Lamhay" music video, from their album, directed by Zulfiqar Jabbar Khan. On 11 November, Jal went on performing at Lahore Grammar School 55-Main branch along with Call. In December, Jal received a special award by Shaukat Khanum Cancer Hospital in recognition of their support and efforts to raise funds for fighting cancer in Pakistan.
 
Atif Aslam, released his debut solo album Jal Pari, after he left the band, which included few songs from Jal's first studio album. This led to a dispute between Atif and Jal about who owned the rights to the songs as Goher took the dispute to court. However, the final statement from the court went in favour of both the artists as the songs which were included in both the artist albums were compositions of both Atif and Goher. Thus, the dispute ended between the two musicians.

On 2 February 2005, Jal performed a charity concert for the Indian Ocean earthquake and tsunami victims at Alhamra Auditorium in Lahore. In the same year, the title track "Aadat", from their debut album, was remade for the Bollywood movie Kalyug, directed by Mohit Suri and produced by Mahesh Bhatt. Also, Jal band members established themselves as a popular and commercially successful band in Pakistan, as their début album continued to top the music charts locally, and the release of their single "Lamhay" turned out to be another successful single by the band in 2004, and even a year after its release. The song created controversy as a remix version of the song later appeared in the Bollywood movie Zeher, released in March 2005. Jal accused the film producers of stealing their song, "Lamhay". In response to this accusation, the music director for the movie, Anu Malik, credited himself for only "re-creating" the song on the album, but there was still a heavily noticeable resemblance. Roop Kumar Rathod is credited as the "composer" for the song, while the original composer of the song is vocalist, lead guitarist, Goher Mumtaz, of the band. However, Atif Aslam, who sang the song for the movie, faced legal problems over the band name "Jal" with the existing members.
 On 30 April, Jal due to the success of their debut studio album won four awards and received two nominations at the Indus Music Awards. The band won the "Best Lyrics", "Best Composition" and "Best Song" awards, for their song "Aadat", along with the "Best Band" award at the music awards. Also, the band were nominated for the "Best Music Album", for their debut album and also the "Best Composition", for the song "Lamhay", award. On 24 September, Jal received a nomination for the "Best Song" and "Best Lyrics" award for their song "Lamhay" and also received an award for the "Best Pop Group", for their debut album Aadat, at the Sahara Sangeet Awards, held at Oakland Arena in Oakland, California, United States.

Jal has been invited by the colleges of Pakistan and India as well to perform in the fests. In November 2009 they were received at IIT Roorkee with a crowd of students from across India. Similar concerts across various top colleges keep taking place. For a list of Jal's upcoming concerts one can refer to their.

In 2006, Jal's music video for the song "Ik Din Aayega" was declared as the second best video among the top 100 videos selected by ARY Musik channel. On 31 March 2006, Jal once again went on performing at Alhamra Auditorium in Lahore. The following day, the band went on performing at Nawabshah District, for the first time. Soon afterwards, the band then went on performing across border in neighbouring country, India, at Modern School, New Delhi on 7 April. On 6 May, Jal won the MTV Asia Award for Favorite Artist India at MTV Asia Awards 2006 held at the Siam Paragon in Bangkok, Thailand. The band also performed their song "Aadat" live at the music awards. 

After a month, on 10 June, Jal went on performing live at Defence Club and Arts Council Karachi, in Karachi. Followed by performing live in the capital city of the state Andhra Pradesh, in Hyderabad, India. On 15 December, Jal performed live in front of a crowd of 15, 000 audiences at Tundikhel for the first time in Kathmandu, Nepal. The band opened their act by performing "Teri Yaad", followed by the massive hit "Lamhay" and also performing many cover songs like "Lal Meri Pat". On 23 December, Jal released a video album Woh Lamhay, which included music videos released by the band and remixes of the songs "Aadat" and "Lamhay" by Dr. Zeus, through the record label HOM Records.

Success (2007–2009)
In 2007, Jal struck a deal with Gibson Guitar Corporation, becoming the first South Asian band in history (along with the Pakistani pop rock band Strings) to create a working relationship with the famed guitar manufacturers. It was reported that according to the deal, Jal will exclusively use Gibson guitars during concerts, studio recordings and music videos. Furthermore, Jal will act as brand ambassadors to Gibson. In return, Gibson will sponsor the varied endeavours of the band and also provide concert halls and equipment as and when required. Following this, Jal also became the brand ambassadors for the Abu Dhabi based mobile telecommunication company, Warid Telecom. In the same year, Jal entered the recording studios to work on their second studio album release. The mixing and engineering of the album was done by Mekaal Hasan and Goher Mumtaz. The album was recorded at Digital Fidelity Studios in Lahore, where the band also recorded their debut album Aadat in 2004. All songs on the album were composed and written by Goher Mumtaz with the exception of one track, which is written by Farhan Saeed and the album was produced by Mekaal Hasan. On 14 December, Jal went on releasing their second studio album Boondh, through the record label Fire Records, sponsored by Warid Telecom. Farhan Saeed, the lead vocalist of the band, explained "the title of the album Boondh is not the name of any song in the album, but is basically the theme of the album and covers all the songs in it. The name suggests that we as a band are just like a small droplet of water in the sea of music, which covers Pakistan, Asia and the entire world where our music is heard. It is our small contribution to the sea of music," said Farhan. This was followed by a live tour, mainly in South Asia, with concerts all over Pakistan, and a few places in India. The following day, Jal released their first music video of the single "Sajni" from their second album, directed by Bilal Lashari. The single was a major hit all over Pakistan, topping all of the charts in the country, just after a month of its release.

In 2008, Jal were signed to Unilever as they became the brand ambassadors for Wall's ice cream. On 19 February, Jal released the video of their new single "Chaltay Chaltay" featuring Bollywood actress Amrita Rao. The single later appeared as a bonus track on the band's second album, when re-released on 26 February in Pakistan and 26 March, internationally. Jal's second album Boondh became an instantaneous hit, winning the Lux Style Award for "Album of the Year". The song "Sajni" from this album also won the Best Song and Video of the Year awards at the same ceremony. On 14 June, Jal won the "Best Song" award for the song "Chaltay Chaltay" at The Musik Awards. This was followed by Jal travelling to Toronto, Canada, performing at Markham Fair Grounds in South Asian Mela, on 15 June. Then going to performing live at Corianthas in Pune, India. On 13 July, the band once again travelled to Canada this time performing at the Wonder Land in Toronto. Followed by a number of concerts in Pakistan and India and then travelling to perform at Rådhusplassen in Oslo, Norway, on 24 August. Jal's video "Sajni", directed by Bilal Lashari, went on winning the 'Best Pop Video Award' at MTV Video Awards 2008.

On 9 April 2009, Jal went on performing at Qurum City Amphitheatre in Muscat, Oman, for the first time. In May, Jal won the 'Best Ballad' award for their single "Moré Piya" and were nominated for the 'Best Band' award at the first MTV Pakistan Video Awards.

2010–2011

On 11 May, it was confirmed that Jal will be performing at Coke Studio season four first episode, which will be aired on 22 May, through a Coke Studio television promo of the first episode. On 14 May, in a behind the scenes video of Jal performing at a Coke Studio session, Goher Mumtaz discussed about performing a new song, "Ik Aarzu", at Coke Studio as it would be more challenging for the band. On 22 May, Coke Studio fourth season first episode aired in which Jal performed "Ik Aarzu", added with classical sufi poetry of Bulleh Shah infusion into the band's song lyrics, featuring with backing vocals by Zoe Viccaji and Rachel Viccaji. On 24 May, in a review of the Coke Studio fourth season, first episode, The Express Tribune newspaper gave Jal's performance for the song "Ik Aarzu" a 7/10 rating. On 19 June, the third episode of Coke Studio fourth season aired saw the band sing their hit song "Panchi", from Aadat, with singer QB, who came in with her rendition of the Mohammad Ali Sheikhi and Allan Fakir's hit song "Tere Ishq Mae Jo Bhi Doob Gaya". The Express Tribune newspaper also gave this performance by the band a 7/10 rating.

On 22 August, the band's lead vocalist Farhan Saeed released a solo single cover of "Halka Halka Suroor" paying tribute to late Nusrat Fateh Ali Khan. The release of the song led to spreading rumours that the vocalist has parted ways with Jal. On 3 September, Saeed in an interview to The Express Tribune finally confirmed these speculations, disclosing his departure from the band to pursue a solo career. Saeed claimed that he disclosed his decision to Mumtaz and Aamir around the first week of Ramazan, saying "I invited them over to my café and explained my reasons for leaving the band. Goher offered that I could pursue my solo career while being a part of the band, but for me it's always been black or white as Jal would be my priority if I stay with the band."

Jal performed in front of an audience of 2000. They sang sajni pass bulao na "'& 'Aadat' Mellifluously according to 74.5% audience.

Change (2012–2013)

On 8 Sep 2012, lead vocalist and lead guitarist, Goher Mumtaz in an interview with Rj Syed Ali confirmed that the band's third album, Pyaas, which was originally slated for a March 2012 release date, was delayed to be released on end of the year.The Making of Legends Retrieved on 27 July 2012. Gohar, inspired from success of Fawad Khan; former member of band EP, took up acting as a side project in a Pakistani serial. Unlike Fawad, critics found his acting weaker and hence, he failed miserably. JAL released their 3rd Album "Pyaas" on 11 March 2013.

On 13 February, JAL released the video of their song Tanhai which became the OST of Drama Serial Tanhai for HumTV. On 9 April 2013, JAL released the video of their song "Dil Haari" Song from their 3rd Album Pyaas. on 16 June, JAL performed at O2 London. JAL is the First Pakistani Band to perform at O2, the most prestigious venue of world. On 1 September 2013, JAL released their 3rd Video Song "Pyaas" from their 3rd Album Pyaas.

Disintegration (2014)
On 23 December 2013, Aamir Tufail aka Shazi officially left the band.

2014 to 2016
On 6 January 2014, JAL released the video of their song Lao Guitar from their 3rd Album Pyaas, which as expected by its title, also failed to make an impression. While the shooting of Lao Guitar Video, Goher Mumtaz had an accident. In May 2014, JAL Performed for Ary Musik series The Floor. JAL performed Laiyan Laiyan & Panchi, Dil Haari, Aadat & Tanhai, Ik Aarzu, Woh Lamhay, Dil Haaray Pukaray, Udd Jaana in The Floor Live Sessions for ARY Musik.

On 17 January 2015, JAL released the video song "Tu Qadam Barhaye Ja" for Pakistan Armed Forces.

On 21 April 2015, JAL released their music video song "Teray Baajon". The song top all the music charts in few days after it released. On 6 September 2015, JAL released the video song "Ooncha" for The official PAF 50th Anniversary of 1965 war. On 7 November 2015, JAL released Khel Sajna for Drama Serial Neelam Kinaray For Hum Sitaray. The new Single Khel sejna became #1 on taazi charts in just 10 days. On 14 November 2015, JAL released the music video of Their First ever Medley from all 3 albums (Signature Mix) which includes these songs Chup Chup, Kash Yeh Pal, Woh Lamhay, Mahiya. On 6 November 2016, JAL released the video of their song Tu Muskura from their 3rd Album Pyaas.

2017 And Future

JAL released the video of their new single title Parinda on 5 May 2017. JAL the band revealed the title of their 2 upcoming songs, Bhanwaray & Pal. Among them Bhanwaray' Premiered Feb 14, 2020 (Valentine's day) on YouTube as their first release of this decade 2020 Featuring Sabeeka Imam.

Discography

Albums

Singles

Coke Studio Pakistan

Pakistani Drama Soundtrack

Music Videos

Band members
Current members

Goher Mumtaz – Vocals, Lead Guitar (2002–present)

Ali Khan – Lead guitar (2017–present)

Amir Azhar – Bass guitar (2013–present)

Salman Albert – Drums (2003–present)

Former members

Atif Aslam – vocals, backing vocals (2002–2003)

Farhan Saeed – vocals, backing vocals (2003–2011)

Aamir Tufail aka Shazi – Bass guitar (2003–2013)

Omer Nadeem – Bass guitar (2003–2003)

Awards and nominations

See also 
 List of Pakistani music bands

References

External links
 

Musical groups established in 2002
Pakistani musical trios
Pakistani musical groups
Pakistani rock music groups
Musical groups from Lahore
2002 establishments in Pakistan